A Kind of Spark is a middle grade novel by Elle McNicoll, published on June 4, 2020, by Knights Of Media. The book follows Addie, "an autistic 11-year-old [who] seeks to memorialize the women once tried as witches in her Scottish village."

Reception 
A Kind of Spark was generally well-received, including a starred review from School Library Journal.

Kirkus Reviews called the book "[e]arnest and perceptive," noting, "The bullying Addie endures will leave readers’ stomachs in sympathetic knots, but Addie's nuanced relationships with her sisters and a new friend, Audrey, infuse humor and heart."

Publishers Weekly applauded the representation of Addie's autism, stating, "McNicoll, herself neurodivergent, portrays with clarity Addie’s neurological reality, interpersonal bonds, and thoughtful reflections." Deborah Stevenson, writing for The Bulletin of the Center for Children's Books, echoed the sentiment, writing, "McNicoll ... writes Addie’s narration with power and determination; it’s especially strong at revealing the sheer labor required for Addie to negotiate the world ... and the toll it takes, which is evident in Keedie as well." Stevenson concluded, "Whether they’re facing similar neurodivergent challenges or not, readers will appreciate Addie’s honesty, and they may follow her lead in reconsidering history."

References 

2020 children's books
21st-century American literature
Books about autism
English-language literature
Novels set in Scotland